Franz Hermann Troschel (10 October 1810 – 6 November 1882) was a German zoologist born in Spandau.

He studied mathematics and natural history at the University of Berlin, where he was awarded his doctorate in 1834. From 1840 to 1849 he was an assistant to Martin Lichtenstein at the Natural History Museum of Berlin. In 1849 he became a professor of zoology and natural history at the University of Bonn. In 1851 he became a member of the Academy of Sciences Leopoldina.

Troschel is remembered for the identification and classification of species in the fields of malacology, ichthyology and herpetology.

Taxon named in his honor 
A few of the species that contain his name are 
Troschel's sea star (Evasterias troschelii),  
Troschel's murex (Murex troschelii), and a 
freshwater snail (Bithynia troschelii). 

Chlorurus troschelii, commonly known as Troschel's parrotfish, is a species of marine ray-finned fish, a parrotfish from the family Scaridae. It is native to the eastern Indian Ocean, where it lives in coral reefs.

Bibliography 
(incomplete)
 1842 (With Johannes Peter Müller (1801–1858)).
 Über die Bedeutsamkeit des naturgeschichtlichen Unterrichts. Berlin 1845.
 Horae ichthyologicae. Berlin 1845–49, 3 volumes (With Johannes Peter Müller).
 Handbuch der Zoologie, third to seventh edition, Berlin 1848/1853/1859/1864/1871, (original authors Arend Friedrich August Wiegmann (1802–1841) and Johann Friedrich Ruthe (1788–1859)). Digital 6th edition by the University and State Library Düsseldorf
 Troschel F. H. 1856–1879. Das Gebiß der Schnecken zur Begründung einer natürlichen Klassifikation. Berlin 1856–1879, two volumes. Volume 1 and volume 2 were published in parts:
 1856. Volume 1, part 1: 1–72, plates 1–4.
 (before 30 October) 1857. 1(2): 73–112, plates 5–8.
 1858. 1(3): 113–152, plates 9–12.
 1861. 1(4): 153–196, plates 13–16.
 1863. 1(5): i–viii, 197–252, plates 17–20.
 (December) 1865. 2(1): 1–48, plates 1–4.
 (December) 1867. 2(2): 49–96, plates 5–8.
 1869. 2(3): 97–132, plates 9–12.
 1875. 2(4): 133–180, plates 13–16.
 (18 September) 1878. 2(5): 181–216, plates 17–20.
 (2 September) 1879. 2(6): 217–246, plates 21–24.
 Two last parts 2(7) and 2(8) were continued by Johannes Thiele and published in 1891 and 1893.
 Troschel was the editor of Archiv für Naturgeschichte from volume 15 (1849) to 48 (1882), Berlin, Nicolaische Verlagsbuchhandlung (Volume 35, part 2, online).

Taxon described by him
See :Category:Taxa named by Franz Hermann Troschel

References

 This article is based on a translation of an equivalent article at the German Wikipedia.
H. von Dechen, 1883. Zur Erinnerung an Dr. Franz Hermann Troschel;  Verhandlungen des Naturhistorischen Vereines der Preussischen Rheinlande und Westfalens 40 (Correspondenzblatt 1): p. 35–54 (biography and  bibliography).

External links 
 

1810 births
1882 deaths
German malacologists
19th-century German zoologists
Teuthologists
Scientists from Berlin
People from Spandau
Academic staff of the University of Bonn